Zacua México is an electric microcar manufacturer based in Mexico City, which was founded in 2017.

History
Zacua was founded in July 2017 in Mexico City, being the first company in the history of the local automotive industry to introduce the production and sale of a Mexican electric car. For this purpose, cooperation was established with the French automaker Automobiles Chatenet, which lent its internal combustion microcar Chatenet CH30 to develop its Mexican twin, which differs from scratch by a completely new powertrain.

In this way, the Zacua MX3 was created along with the MX2 coupe variant, for which the electric driveline was the responsibility of the Spanish company Dynamik Technological Alliance. The batteries were supplied by a Chinese partner, and the production was launched in Puebla in 2019, with a view to the public, intensively developing market for small, cheap electric cars. The family of electric microcars is only available on the domestic Mexican market, where it competes with the well-known Renault Twizy. The manufacturer is proud that most of the body and drivetrain components are manufactured from scratch in Mexico.

Vehicles 
 Zacua MX2
 Zacua MX3

References

External links 
 

Car brands
Car manufacturers of Mexico
Electric vehicle manufacturers of Mexico
Mexican companies established in 2017
Vehicle manufacturing companies established in 2017
Manufacturing companies based in Mexico City